Columnea crassifolia is a species of Gesneriaceae that is native to Honduras and Mexico.

References

External links
 
 

crassifolia
Plants described in 1844
Flora of Mexico
Taxa named by Adolphe-Théodore Brongniart